Jessica Schleider is an American psychologist, author, and an assistant professor of clinical psychology at Stony Brook University. She is a faculty affiliate at the Alan Alda Center for Communicating Science and the lab director of the Lab for Scalable Mental Health.

Education and degrees 

Schleider began her academic career at Swarthmore College, working with psychology professor Jane Gillham, Ph.D., as her thesis advisor. In 2011, Schleider received the Wallach Fellowship for her thesis; she continued work on it with Gillham after graduation, resulting in a publication in Current Psychiatry Reviews. She graduated from Swarthmore College in 2012 with a Bachelor of Arts in Psychology, next pursuing a Master's degree at Harvard University working with Psychology professor John Weisz, Ph.D., as her advisor. During her time as a masters student, she received the Stimson Fund Research Grant in 2012, the William H. Talley Award in 2013–2014, and the Karen Stone Fellowship in 2013–2014. With the grant and the award, she completed publications as a co-author with Weisz in the Journal of Abnormal Child Psychology and the Child Psychiatry and Human Development Journal. In 2014, Schleider received her Masters of Arts in Psychology. In 2018, she completed her final steps of education with a Doctoral Internship in Clinical and Community Psychology on a track of Consultation, Prevention, and Program Evaluation Services at Yale University School of Medicine and finally her Ph.D. in Clinical Psychology at Harvard University.

Positions and roles
Assistant professor of Psychology and Clinical Psychology Ph.D. Program at Stony Brook University

Faculty Affiliate at the Alan Alda Center for Communicating Science.

Lab director for the Lab for Scalable Mental Health.

Research
Schleider's research focuses on the development, evaluation, and dissemination of brief (single-session, under 30 minutes) interventions for children and adolescents experiencing mental health difficulties. The goal of developing these single session interventions (SSIs) is to increase the availability and accessibility of effective evidence-based interventions, particularly for underserved groups (e.g. LGBTQ+ and youth of Color). Schleider leads the Lab for Scalable Mental Health, where these interventions are designed and evaluated. Her research aims to evaluate the effectiveness of the interventions (whether they work) and the mechanisms of change (how and why they work). Many of Schleider's brief interventions target symptoms of anxiety and depression among adolescents (ages 11–17). She has also developed SSIs that help parents learn to support their child's mental health treatment. Schleider has made many of her interventions publicly available as part of her commitment to open science practices. Over the course of her career, Schleider's team has now reached an estimated 30,000 individuals through single session interventions.

Honors and awards

Selected publications
Schleider has published more than 80 scientific articles and book chapters. She has created or co-created six open-access, single-session mental health programs, which have served over 14,000 teens and adults. She has written a self-help workbook, titled "The Growth Mindset Workbook for Teens" and co-edited the Oxford Guide to Brief and Low-Intensity Interventions for Children and Young People.
 Schleider, J.L., Mullarkey, M.C., Fox, K.R., Dobias, M.L., Shroff, A., Hart, E.A., Roulston, C. (2022). A Randomized Trial of Online Single-Session Interventions for Adolescent Depression during COVID-19. Nature Human Behavior, 6, 258–268. doi: 10.1080/15374416.2019.1683852.
 Schleider, J.L. (2022). Repairing the Research-Service Rupture in Clinical Psychological Science. Nature Reviews Psychology, 1, 2–4. DOI:10.1038/s44159-021-0005-z.
 Dobias, M.L., Morris, R., Schleider, J.L. (2022). Single-session interventions embedded within Tumblr: A test of acceptability and utility. JMIR Formative Research, 6(7), e39004. DOI:10.2196/39004. 
 Schleider, J.L., Dobias, M.L., Mullarkey, M.C., Ollendick, T. (2021). Retiring, Rethinking, and Reconstructing the Norm of Once-Weekly Psychotherapy. Administration and Policy in Mental Health and Mental Health Services Research, 48, 4–8. DOI:10.1007/s10488-020-01090-7.
 Sung, J.Y., Mumper, E., Schleider J.L. (2021). Empowering Parents to Manage Child Avoidance Behaviors: Randomized Trial of a Single-Session Intervention Targeting Parent Accommodation. Journal of Medical Internet Research: Mental Health, 8(7), e29538. DOI:10.2196/preprints.29538
 Schleider, J.L., Dobias, M.L., Sung, J.Y., Mullarkey M.C. (2020). Future directions in single-session youth mental health interventions. Journal of Clinical Child and Adolescent Psychology, 2, 264–278. DOI:10.1007/s10488-021-01146-2 
 Schleider, J.L., Dobias, M.L., Sung J.Y., Mumper, E., Mullarkey, M.C. (2020). Acceptability and utility of an open-access, online single-session intervention platform for adolescent mental health. Journal of Medical Internet Research: Mental Health, 7, e2013. DOI:10.2196/20513
 Schleider, J. L., & Weisz, J. (2017). A single-session growth mindset intervention for adolescent anxiety and depression: 9-month outcomes of a randomized trial. Journal of Child Psychology and Psychiatry, 59(2), 160–170. DOI:10.1111/jcpp.12811
 Schleider, J. L., & Weisz, J. R. (2017). Little treatments, promising effects? Meta-analysis of single-session interventions for youth psychiatric problems. Journal of the American Academy of Child & Adolescent Psychiatry, 56(2), 107–115. DOI:10.1016/j.jaac.2016.11.007  
Schleider, J. L., & Weisz, J. R. (2016). Reducing risk for anxiety and depression in adolescents: Effects of a single-session intervention teaching that personality can change. Behavior Research and Therapy, 87, 170–181. DOI:10.1016/j.brat.2016.09.011

References

External links 
Stony Brook University Faculty Page
Schleider Lab Website

21st-century American psychologists
Biographical works
Harvard University alumni
Biography articles of living people
American women psychologists
Living people
Year of birth missing (living people)